"Modern Day Delilah" is a song by the American hard rock band Kiss, released on their nineteenth album Sonic Boom, in 2009. It was released on August 19, 2009 as the first single off the album and the band's first single in eleven years. The song charted on US Mainstream Rock Tracks and Swedish Sverigetopplistan.

Background
"Modern Day Delilah" was announced and released as the lead single from Sonic Boom on August 19, 2009 to radio. The song was Kiss' first single release in 11 years, the song's predecessor being "You Wanted the Best" which was released in 1998 off the band's Psycho Circus album. Due to early previews of the album, the song gained positive feedback from both critics and fans, and has been compared to the band's '70s work. The song was played on the Kiss Alive/35 World Tour.

The music video leaked online on the first days of December and was officially released on December 9, 2009 and premiered on Yahoo! The video is topped and tailed by footage of giant sized members of Kiss walking through Detroit. The video went on to top UK music video channel Scuzz's "Most Rockin: Viewer Request Show" chart on December 3, 2009.

The single was released as Downloadable Content for Guitar Hero 5 and Band Hero on 11/19/09 along with the singles: "I Was Made for Lovin' You" and "Lick It Up".

"Modern Day Delilah" peaked at #50 on the Billboard Rock songs chart. Classic Rock Magazine listed the song as the eleventh best rock song of the past decade.

Live appearances
The band had first played the song in Detroit Cobo Hall on September 25, twelve days before the release of Sonic Boom, the band's first studio album in eleven years. The song was initially performed in the middle of the concert, but was later played as the opening track.

Personnel
Paul Stanley – lead vocals, rhythm guitar
Gene Simmons – bass guitar, backing vocals
Tommy Thayer – lead guitar, backing vocals
Eric Singer – drums, backing vocals

Charts

References

Kiss (band) songs
2009 singles
Songs written by Paul Stanley
Music videos directed by Wayne Isham
2009 songs
Roadrunner Records singles